Knud Nielsen Kirkeløkke (10 November 1892 – 7 February 1976) was a Danish gymnast who competed in the 1920 Summer Olympics. He was part of the Danish team, which won the silver medal for the gymnastics men's team in the 1920 Swedish system event.

References

External links
 

1892 births
1976 deaths
Danish male artistic gymnasts
Gymnasts at the 1920 Summer Olympics
Olympic gymnasts of Denmark
Olympic silver medalists for Denmark
Olympic medalists in gymnastics
Medalists at the 1920 Summer Olympics